Mapledale is an unincorporated community in Greenbrier County, West Virginia, United States. Mapledale is located on West Virginia Route 92m northwest of White Sulphur Springs.

References

Unincorporated communities in Greenbrier County, West Virginia
Unincorporated communities in West Virginia